Rzhevka Airport  is an airport in Leningrad Oblast, Russia located 15 km east of Saint Petersburg. Now the airport serves small aircraft.

The airport was officially closed in 2007 and its runways are currently used as dealer car parking. A Soviet-made Il-14 and a few smaller aircraft have been abandoned on the apron since then but the airport was restored in 2015 .

References

External links
  Rzhevka Airport official website

Defunct airports
Airports built in the Soviet Union
Airports in Leningrad Oblast